Mohan Priyadarshana De Silva (born 23 December 1966) is a Sri Lankan politician, Former Cabinet Minister, and member of the Parliament of Sri Lanka. He belongs to the Sri Lanka Podujana Peramuna. Mohan P. de Silva is a lawyer by profession and was educated at St. Aloysius' College, Galle. Following the mass resignation of the Sri Lankan cabinet in the wake of the 2022 Sri Lankan protests, he was appointed as the Minister of Water Supplies by President Gotabaya Rajapaksa on 18 April 2022, he served in this role until 9 May 2022 following another resignation of the Sri Lankan Cabinet.

References

External links
Mohan Priyadharshana de Silva

Members of the 14th Parliament of Sri Lanka
Members of the 15th Parliament of Sri Lanka
Members of the 16th Parliament of Sri Lanka
Sri Lanka Freedom Party politicians
Living people
1966 births
Alumni of St. Aloysius' College, Galle